Francisco Serp (born 19 April 1930) is an Argentine former fencer. He competed in the individual and team épée events at the 1964 Summer Olympics.

References

External links
 

1930 births
Possibly living people
Argentine male fencers
Argentine épée fencers
Olympic fencers of Argentina
Fencers at the 1964 Summer Olympics
Pan American Games medalists in fencing
Pan American Games bronze medalists for Argentina
Fencers at the 1959 Pan American Games